Detlef Kühn (born 3 January 1959) is a German wrestler. He competed in the men's Greco-Roman 82 kg at the 1980 Summer Olympics.

References

External links
 

1959 births
Living people
German male sport wrestlers
Olympic wrestlers of East Germany
Wrestlers at the 1980 Summer Olympics
People from Königstein, Saxony
Sportspeople from Saxony
20th-century German people